Neobellamira delicata is a species of beetle in the family Cerambycidae, the only species in the genus Neobellamira.

References

Lepturinae